ʻEua 11 is an electoral constituency for the Legislative Assembly in the Kingdom of Tonga. It was established for the November 2010 general election, when the multi-seat regional constituencies for People's Representatives were replaced by single-seat constituencies, electing one representative via the first past the post electoral system. It covers the whole of the island of ʻEua, and the much smaller adjacent island of Kalau. Despite the "11" in its name, there is only one constituency for ʻEua; each constituency in the country is given a number.

Its first ever representative was Sunia Fili, who had first been elected to Parliament in 1999. Elected as an independent MP in 2010, he was appointed Minister for Finance by Prime Minister Lord Tuʻivakano. Though elected as an independent, he was close to the Democratic Party of the Friendly Islands, and joined it in 2012 after resigning from the government.

Fili was replaced by Tevita Lavemaau at the 2014 election. Lavemaau was re-elected in 2017, but lost the seat at the 2021 election to Taniela Fusimalohi.

Members of Parliament

Election results

2010

2014
Along with five other incumbent DPFI MPs, Sunia Fili was not selected as a DPFI candidate for this election, and announced he would be running as an independent candidate.

2017

References

Tongan legislative constituencies
2010 establishments in Tonga
Constituencies established in 2010
ʻEua